Sylvia Plimack Mangold (born September 18, 1938) is an American artist, painter, printmaker, and pastelist. She is known for her representational depictions of interiors and landscapes. She is the mother of film director/screenwriter James Mangold and musician Andrew Mangold.

Life and career
Sylvia Plimack was born in New York City to a family of Jewish background. She is the daughter of Ethel (Rein), an office administrator, and Maurice Plimack, an accountant and businessman. She grew up in Queens, and attended the High School of Music and Art in Manhattan, after high school she was accepted into the program at Cooper Union in 1956. She continued her studies at Yale University and graduated with a B.F.A. in 1961. In the same year she married Yale classmate and fellow painter Robert Mangold.

After studying at Yale with William Bailey and others, Plimack Mangold worked as a representational painter. Her paintings in the early 1960s were paintings of floors, walls and corners, compositions where mirror images were also introduced, making the space more complex. In the 1970s, she added trompe-l'œil elements such as metal rulers and masking tape along the borders of the images.

In the 1980s she introduced the images of the landscape to the canvas affixed by the image of masking tape. Eventually, the landscape image filled the entire canvas and focused on individual trees, their branches cropped so as to create the spaces between the limbs and branches of the trees. All the landscape paintings are done from observation. Even as the subject matter of Plimack Mangold's paintings has shifted, her work has always been based in perceptual realism, inviting viewers to observe from up close and mirroring her own process of observation.

Mangold received a grant from the National Endowment for the Arts in 1975. Her work has been the subject of solo exhibitions at the Museum of Fine Arts, Boston, the Neuberger Museum of Art at the State University of New York at Purchase, the Albright-Knox Art Gallery (Buffalo, New York), and the Wadsworth Atheneum (Hartford, Connecticut), and is represented in the aforementioned museums in Boston, Hartford, and the Brooklyn Museum of Art. Mangold received the 2007 Cooper Union President’s Citation Award and was inducted into The Cooper Union Hall of Fame in 2009.

Selected exhibitions

Selected solo exhibitions 
 2017: Sylvia Plimack Mangold: Summer and Winter, Alexander and Bonin, New York
 2016: Sylvia Plimack Mangold: Floors and Rulers, 1967-76, Craig F. Starr Gallery, New York
 2012-13: Sylvia Plimack Mangold: Landscape and Trees, Norton Museum of Art, West Palm Beach, Florida
 1999: Sylvia Plimack Mangold: Trees, Herbert F. Johnson Museum of Art, Cornell University, Ithaca, NY
 1997: New Paintings and Watercolors, Annemarie Verna Galerie, Zürich
 1995: Sylvia Plimack Mangold, Paintings, 1990- 1995, Brooke Alexander, New York
 1994-96: The Paintings of Sylvia Plimack Mangold, Albright-Knox Art Gallery, Buffalo, NY; Wadsworth Atheneum, Hartford, CT; Blaffer Art Museum, University of Houston; Museum of Fine Arts, Boston 
 1992: Sylvia Plimack Mangold: Works on Paper 1968-1991, University of Michigan Museum of Art, Ann Arbor; The Minneapolis Institute of Arts; Grunwald Center for the Graphic Arts, UCLA; Neuberger Museum, State University of New York at Purchase; Davison Art Center, Wesleyan University
 1985: Rhona Hoffman Gallery, Chicago
 1982: Sylvia Plimack Mangold: Paintings 1965-1982, Madison Art Center, WI; Grand Rapids Art Museum, MI
 1982: The Art of Sylvia Plimack Mangold, Duke University Museum of Art, Durham, NC
 1981: Perspectives: Sylvia Mangold: Nocturnal Paintings, Contemporary Arts Museum, Houston
 1980-81: Sylvia Plimack Mangold: Matrix 62, Wadsworth Atheneum, Hartford
 1980: Young Hoffman Gallery, Chicago
 1980: Sylvia Mangold, Ohio State University Gallery of Fine Art, Columbus
 1978: Annemarie Verna Galerie, Zürich
 1978: Droll/Kolbert Gallery, New York
 1975: Sylvia Plimack Mangold: Recent Paintings, Daniel Weinberg Gallery, San Francisco
 1974: Fischbach Gallery, New York

Selected group exhibitions 
 2017: Looking Back / The 11th White Columns Annual, White Columns, New York
 2017: Elements of XXX, Part I, 47 Canal, New York
 2016: Approaching American Abstraction, San Francisco Museum of Modern Art
 2013: EXPO 1: New York, MoMA PS1, Long Island City
 2012-13: Materializing “Six Years”: Lucy R. Lippard and the Emergence of Conceptual Art, Brooklyn Museum
 2011: Exhibition of Work by Newly Elected Members and Recipients of Honors and Awards, American Academy of Arts and Letters, New York
 2007: WACK! Art and the Feminist Revolution, Museum of Contemporary Art, Los Angeles; The National Museum of Women in the Arts, Washington, DC; MoMA PS1, New York; Vancouver Art Gallery, BC
 2006: Plane Figure: American Art in Swiss Private Collections and from the Kunstmuseum Winterthur, Kunstmuseum Winterthur
 2004: Neil Jenney, Ree Morton, Sylvia Plimack Mangold: early works 1965-1975, Alexander and Bonin, New York 
 2002: 110 Years: The Permanent Collection of the Modern Art Museum of Fort Worth, Modern Art Museum of Fort Worth, TX
 1999: Afterimage: Drawing Through Process, The Museum of Contemporary Art, Los Angeles
 1993: Yale Collects Yale, 1950-1993, Yale University Art Gallery, New Haven, CT
 1991: Open Mind: The LeWitt Collection, Wadsworth Atheneum, Hartford, CT
1980: Drawings: The Pluralist Decade, United States Pavilion, Venice Biennial XXXIX; Institute of Contemporary Art, University of Pennsylvania, Philadelphia; Henie Onstad Museum, Hovikodden, Norway; Biblioteca Nationale Madrid; Gulbenkian Museum, Lisbon
 1977: Ten Years 1967-1977: A View of the Decade, Museum of Contemporary Art, Chicago 
 1977: Documenta 6, Kassel, Germany
 1975: 1975 Selections from the Collection of Dorothy and Herbert Vogel, The Clocktower Institute for Art and Urban Resources, P.S. 1 (now MoMA PS1), Long Island City, NY
 1972: Annual Exhibition: Contemporary American Painting, Whitney Museum of American Art, New York
 1971: Summer Exhibition: Tony Berlant, Mario Dubsky, Sylvia Mangold, Gordon Newton, Susan Shatter, Sylvia Stone, Robert Swain, Lynton Wells, Knoedler Gallery, New York
 1969: Direct Representation: An Exhibition of Five New Realist Artists Selected by Scott Burton, Fischbach Gallery, New York; London Arts Gallery, Detroit
 1968: Realism Now, Vassar College Art Gallery, Poughkeepsie, NY

Selected collections 
 Museum of Fine Arts, Boston
 Albright-Knox Art Gallery, Buffalo
 Art Institute of Chicago 
 Modern Art Museum of Fort Worth, TX
 Wadsworth Atheneum, Hartford
 Museum of Fine Arts, Houston
 Indianapolis Museum of Art
 Nelson-Atkins Museum, Kansas City, MO
 The British Museum, London
 Minneapolis Institute of Arts
 Walker Art Center, Minneapolis
 Yale University Art Gallery, New Haven
 Brooklyn Museum, New York
 Metropolitan Museum of Art, New York
 The Museum of Modern Art, New York
 New Museum of Contemporary Art, New York
 New York Public Library, New York
 Whitney Museum of American Art, New York
 Utah Museum of Fine Arts, Salt Lake City
 Iris & B. Gerald Cantor Center for Visual Arts, Stanford University
 Kunstmuseum Winterthur, Switzerland
 Norton Museum of Art, West Palm Beach

Selected bibliography 
 Sylvia Plimack Mangold: Floors and Rules, 1967–76.  Published by Craig F. Starr Gallery, New York, 2016
 Sylvia Plimack Mangold: Landscape and Trees, ex. cat. West Palm Beach, Florida: Norton Museum of Art, 2012 
 Sylvia Plimack Mangold. Published by Alexander and Bonin, New York, 2012
 Natural Sympathies: Sylvia Plimack Mangold and Lovis Corinth Works on Paper. Published by Alexander and Bonin, New York, 2009
 The Paintings of Sylvia Plimack Mangold. Co-published by Albright-Knox Art Gallery, Buffalo and Hudson Hills Press, New York, 1994 
 Sylvia Plimack Mangold: Works on Paper 1968-1991. Co-published by Davison Art Center, Wesleyan University and University of Michigan Museum of Art, Ann Arbor, 1992 
 Sylvia Plimack Mangold Paintings 1987-1989. Published by Brooke Alexander, New York, 1989
 Sylvia Plimack Mangold Paintings 1965-1982. Published by Madison Art Center, Madison, Wisconsin, 1982
 Inches and Field. Published by Lapp Princess Press Ltd., New York, 1978

References

Sources
Biography, National Museum of Women in the Arts
Brutvan, Cheryl, The Paintings of Sylvia Plimack Mangold, Hudson Hills Press, September 1994, 
List of recent exhibitions, Riverhouse Editions

External links
Dallas Museum of Art
Museum of Fine Arts, Boston
Castellani Art Museum, work and critical descriptions

1938 births
Living people
Cooper Union alumni
Yale School of Art alumni
Modern painters
Jewish American artists
The High School of Music & Art alumni
Artists from New York City
20th-century American women artists
Members of the American Academy of Arts and Letters